Count Louis Charles Joseph Marie de Brouchoven de Bergeyck (14 May 1871 – 20 December 1938) was a Belgian politician. He was governor of the province of Antwerp from 15 November 1907 until 14 March 1908.

Political career
Louis de Brouchoven de Bergeyck was a member of the Belgian Parliament from 1908 until 1912 and a senator in the Belgian Senate from 1918 until 1936.

Sources
 Steve Heylen, Bart De Nil, Bart D’hondt, Sophie Gyselinck, Hanne Van Herck en Donald Weber, Geschiedenis van de provincie Antwerpen. Een politieke biografie, Antwerpen, Provinciebestuur Antwerpen, 2005, Vol. 2 p. 45

1871 births
1938 deaths
Governors of Antwerp Province
People from Antwerp Province
Louis